The men's freestyle 65 kg is a competition featured at the Golden Grand Prix Ivan Yarygin 2018, and was held in Krasnoyarsk, Russia on the 27th of January.

Medalists

Results
Legend
F — Won by fall

Final

Top half
qualification: Nachyn Kuular of Tuva def. Islam Dudaev of Chechnya by TF, (5-2)

Section 1

Bottom half

Section 2

Repechage

References

Men's freestyle 65 kg